Dyspessacossus is a genus of moths in the family Cossidae.

Species
 Dyspessacossus fereidun Grum-Grshimailo, 1895
 Dyspessacossus funkei (Röber, 1896)
 Dyspessacossus hadjiensis Daniel, 1953

References

Natural History Museum Lepidoptera generic names catalog

Cossinae
Moth genera